Renfrew Town Hall is a municipal facility at The Cross, Renfrew, Renfrewshire, Scotland. The town hall, which was the headquarters of the royal burgh of Renfrew, is a Category A listed building.

History
The original town hall on the site was built in 1670; it was expanded with the construction of a new wing, creating a public hall on the ground floor and council chambers on the first floor, in 1826. However, after civic leaders decided that it was "very inadequate for any large public meeting or entertainment" and that "it was besides uncomfortable", the old town hall was demolished to make way for a new building.

The foundation stone for the new building was laid with full masonic honours by the local member of parliament, Colonel Archibald Campbell, on 13 April 1872. It designed by James Jamieson Lamb and Baillie James Barr Lamb in the French Gothic style, built at a cost of £7,500 and officially opened by Campbell on 17 October 1873. Following a serious fire on 6 March 1878, it was completely rebuilt in a very similar style but with a taller spire. Internally, the principal rooms were the council chambers and the town clerk's office on the ground floor and the public hall on the first floor. Plasterwork bosses bearing the coats of arms of the burgh, the Bruce family and the Stewart family were installed in the public hall.

The building was the seat of government of the royal burgh of Renfrew until it was replaced by Renfrew District under the wider Strathclyde Regional Council in May 1975. The district council was abolished in 1996, under the Local Government etc. (Scotland) Act 1994, and the building ceased to be a seat of government. Instead the town is represented by a community council, which meets in town hall.

After a programme of restoration works costing £5.2 million supported by the Heritage Lottery Fund, creating modern accommodation for the Renfrew Museum which had previously been based in the Brown Institute in Canal Street, the town hall was officially reopened as a visitor attraction by the Deputy First Minister of Scotland, Nicola Sturgeon, on 18 January 2012.

See also
List of Category A listed buildings in Renfrewshire
List of city chambers and town halls in Scotland
 List of listed buildings in Renfrew, Renfrewshire

References

Renfrew
Government buildings completed in 1873
1873 establishments in Scotland
Buildings and structures in Renfrewshire
Category A listed buildings in Renfrewshire
Listed government buildings in Scotland
Renfrew
Clock towers in the United Kingdom